Breynia cernua grows naturally in Australia and Malesia as a shrub up to  in height.

Breynia cernua presumably is dependent on leafflower moths (Epicephala spp.) for its pollination, like other species of tree in the genus Breynia.

The plant is known by the rather unfortunate name of fart bush.

References

Flora of New Guinea
Flora of Queensland
Flora of Western Australia
Flora of the Northern Territory
Flora of the Solomon Islands (archipelago)
Flora of Sulawesi
Flora of the Philippines
Flora of Borneo
Flora of Java
Flora of Malesia
Plants described in 1866
cernua
Malpighiales of Australia